El Mokrani is a town and commune in Bouïra Province, Algeria. According to the 1998 census it has a population of 4,856.

References

Communes of Bouïra Province
Bouïra Province